St Clement's Church, Norwich, also known as St Clement Colegate, is a Grade I listed redundant parish church in the Church of England in Norwich. It is dedicated to St Clement, a popular Danish saint and patron of seafarers.

History

The church is thought to be one of the first churches erected on the north side of the river. Of Saxon origin, it was built in the medieval ages, probably around 1040.

On the outside, the current Nave replaces an older, narrower one, the cornerstones of which are visible and embedded in the west wall on either side of the tower. The Chancel, Nave and Tower are arranged in a perpendicular style and probably date from the 15th century. The east window of the Chancel, however, is decorated in a different style, suggesting that this part of the building dates further back.

For the interior, the wall arches on both sides of the chancel as well as the roof date from the 15th century. The corbels (brackets) supporting the roof are carved with images of angels bearing shields - two of which with trumpets. The font is in the same perpendicular style as the Chancel, Nave and Tower, as well as being carved with flowers and leaves.

Post Redundancy 
After being made redundant in 1971, it was taken into the care of Norwich Historic Churches Trust. Their work on the church includes restoration of the tower in 1991 after an arson attack, as well as a redecoration inside in 2007

The church stood empty until 1977, when it was repurposed as places of worship, with its initial use being that of prayer and meditation for all faiths opened by Rev'd Jack Burton until 1999. It was then converted to a Romanian Orthodox congregation until 2015 before housing Gildencraft, an apprenticeship scheme for stonemasons. It is now currently in use as a crafts person and builder's store.

Organ

The church contained an organ originally by G.M. Holdich but this organ was moved to All Saints church in 1889 following a new Norman & Beard organ replacement. The current organ is one originally made by Rothwell in 1944 that was modified in 1966 by Ralph Bootman. A specification of the current organ can be found on the National Pipe Organ Register.

References

Clement
Grade I listed buildings in Norfolk